The 2002 term of the Supreme Court of the United States began October 7, 2002, and concluded October 5, 2003. The table illustrates which opinion was filed by each justice in each case and which justices joined each opinion.

Table key

2002 term opinions

2002 term membership and statistics
This was the seventeenth term of Chief Justice Rehnquist's tenure, and the ninth consecutive term in which the Court's membership had not changed.

Notes

References

 

Lists of United States Supreme Court opinions by term